Pachyteria is a genus of round-necked longhorn beetles of the subfamily Cerambycinae and  tribe Callichromatini.

Species
 Pachyteria basalis Waterhouse, 1878 
 Pachyteria calumniata Ritsema, 1890 
 Pachyteria chewi Morati & Huet, 2004 
 Pachyteria coomani Pic, 1927 
 Pachyteria dimidiata Westwood, 1848 
 Pachyteria diversipes Ritsema, 1890 
 Pachyteria equestris (Newman, 1841) 
 Pachyteria fasciata (Fabricius, 1775) 
 Pachyteria hageni Ritsema, 1888 
 Pachyteria javana Bates, 1879 
 Pachyteria kurosawai Niisato, 2001 
 Pachyteria lambii Pascoe, 1866 
 Pachyteria loebli Morati & Huet, 2004 
 Pachyteria melancholica Ritsema, 1909 
 Pachyteria narai Hayashi, 1987 
 Pachyteria nigra Morati & Huet, 2004 
 Pachyteria pasteuri Ritsema, 1892 
 Pachyteria pryeri Ritsema, 1888 
 Pachyteria ruficollis Waterhouse, 1878 
 Pachyteria rugosicollis Ritsema, 1881 
 Pachyteria semiplicata Pic, 1927 
 Pachyteria semivirescens Hayashi, 1992 
 Pachyteria similis Ritsema, 1890 
 Pachyteria speciosa Pascoe, 1866 
 Pachyteria sumatrana Hüdepohl, 1998 
 Pachyteria sumbaensis Hayashi, 1994 
 Pachyteria virescens Pascoe, 1866

References
 Biolib
 Worldwide Cerambycoidea Photo Gallery

Callichromatini